Cavenham Foods was one of the United Kingdom's largest food processing businesses.

History
The company was founded by Sir James Goldsmith in 1965 when he bought up a series of bakeries. In 1971 Cavenham acquired the Bovril Company but then sold most of its dairies and South American operations to finance further take overs. These take-overs came quickly and included Allied Suppliers (a British supermarket business) for £86m in 1972, the Grand Union Company (an American supermarket business) for £62m in 1973, Colonial Stores (another American supermarket business) for £133m in 1978 and J. Weingarten Inc. (also an American supermarket business) in 1979.

Goldsmith divested most of his investments in the early 1980s. The main British part of the business, Allied Suppliers, went to Argyll Foods.

References

British companies established in 1965
Food manufacturers of the United Kingdom
Food manufacturers based in London